Sybra dimidiata is a species of beetle in the family Cerambycidae. It was described by Dillon and Dillon in 1952.

References

dimidiata
Beetles described in 1952